The 8th annual Berlin International Film Festival was held from 27 June to 8 July 1958 with the Zoo Palast as the main venue. The festival was opened by then West Berlin's newly elected mayor Willy Brandt. The Golden Bear was awarded to the Swedish film Smultronstället directed by Ingmar Bergman.

Jury

The following people were announced as being on the jury for the festival:

International feature film jury
 Frank Capra, director, screenwriter and producer (United States) - Jury President
 Joaquim Novais Teixeira, politician, writer and film critic (Portugal)
 Jean Marais, actor (France)
 Paul Rotha, director (United Kingdom)
 L. B. Rao (India)
 Duilio Coletti, director and screenwriter (Italy)
 Michiko Tanaka, actress (Japan)
 Gerhard T. Buchholz, director, screenwriter and producer (West Germany)
 Willy Haas, writer (West Germany)
 Gerhard Lamprecht, director, screenwriter and producer (West Germany)
 Leopold Reitemeister, art historian (West Germany)

International documentary and short jury
 Wali Eddine Sameh, director (Egypt) - Jury President
 Günther Birkenfeld, producer (West Germany)
 Werner Eisbrenner, composer and conductor (West Germany)
 Adolf Forter, producer (Switzerland)
 Anton Koolhaas, writer (Netherlands)
 Jan-Olof Olsson, writer (Sweden)
 Edward Toner, co-founder of the Irish Film Centre (Ireland)

Films in competition
The following films were in competition for the Golden Bear award:

Key
{| class="wikitable" width="550" colspan="1"
| style="background:#FFDEAD;" align="center"| †
|Winner of the main award for best film in its section
|}

Awards

The following prizes were awarded by the Jury:

International jury awards
 Golden Bear: Smultronstället by Ingmar Bergman
 Silver Bear for Best Director: Tadashi Imai for Jun'ai Monogatari
 Silver Bear for Best Actress: Anna Magnani for Wild Is the Wind
 Silver Bear for Best Actor: Sidney Poitier for The Defiant Ones
 Silver Bear Extraordinary Jury Prize: Do Aankhen Barah Haath by Rajaram Vankudre Shantaram

Documentaries and short films jury awards
 Golden Bear (Documentaries): Perri by N. Paul Kenworthy and Ralph Wright
 Silver Bear (Documentaries): Traumstraße der Welt by Hans Domnick
 Short Film Golden Bear: La lunga raccolta by Lionetto Fabbri
 Silver Bear for Best Short Film: ex aequoGlas by Bert HaanstraKönigin im Frauenreich by H. Zickendraht
 
Independent jury awards
FIPRESCI Award ex aequoIce Cold in Alex by J. Lee ThompsonSmultronstället by Ingmar Bergman
Special mention: Jaguar by Sean Graham
OCIC Award
Do Aankhen Barah Haath by Rajaram Vankudre Shantaram
Special Mention (Berlin Senate Education Prize): La Passe du diable by Jacques Dupont and Pierre Schoendoerffer

References

External links
 8th Berlin International Film Festival 1958
1958 Berlin International Film Festival
Berlin International Film Festival:1958 at Internet Movie Database

08
1958 film festivals
1958 in West Germany
1950s in Berlin